Adenanthos forrfstii is a flowering plant from the family Proteaceae that can be found in Western Australia where it is declared to be rare flora. The flowers remain in such colour from April to June and then become greyish-white from August to September. It can be found on coastal dunes and limestone.

References

forrestii
Endemic flora of Western Australia
Taxa named by Ferdinand von Mueller